Pierluigi Gollini (born 18 March 1995) is an Italian professional footballer who plays as a goalkeeper for  club Napoli, on loan from Atalanta, and the Italy national team. Having graduated from Manchester United's youth academy, Gollini began his senior career with Hellas Verona in 2014 and joined Atalanta in 2018, having played for Aston Villa in 2016.

Club career

Hellas Verona 
Gollini joined Hellas Verona in 2014 from Manchester United. He made his Serie A debut on 24 September 2014 as a starter in a 2–2 home draw against Genoa.

Aston Villa 
After two seasons with Verona, Gollini signed for Championship club Aston Villa on 8 July 2016. He made his first appearance for Aston Villa in an 8–0 friendly win over Austrian side Grazer AK the following day.

Gollini started the season as newly relegated Villa's first-choice goalkeeper under manager Roberto Di Matteo; however, Villa struggled in the early parts of the campaign, with Gollini making notable errors against Sheffield Wednesday and Huddersfield Town. Di Matteo was sacked in early October and replaced by Steve Bruce, who continued to play Gollini until December. The Italian was dropped for the festive period games in favour of Mark Bunn, and on 5 January 2017, Villa brought goalkeeper Sam Johnstone in on loan from Manchester United, and he took over as first-choice goalkeeper.

Atalanta 
On 13 January 2017, Gollini signed for Italian club Atalanta on an 18-month loan. On 10 June 2018, Gollini signed permanently for Atalanta for an undisclosed fee. He spent the first half of the year as backup to Etrit Berisha, however claimed the starting spot in the second half of the season. Berisha was loaned out the following summer, making Gollini the undisputed starter. Gollini started every match in Atalanta's debut season in the UEFA Champions League, as they finished second in their group, qualifying for the round of 16.

Tottenham Hotspur 
On 24 July 2021, Gollini joined Premier League club Tottenham Hotspur on loan for the season. He made his debut for the club on 19 August 2021, starting in the UEFA Europa Conference League first leg tie against Paços de Ferreira, which ended in a 1–0 defeat. Gollini returned to his parent club Atalanta on 2 June 2022.

Fiorentina
On 9 July 2022, Gollini joined Fiorentina on a season-long loan, with an option to buy. After starting the first three games of the 2022–23 Serie A season, Gollini moved to the bench, backing up Pietro Terracciano. Gollini was the first-choice goalkeeper for Fiorentina's Europa Conference League campaign, playing in five of their six group stage games.

Napoli
On 25 January 2023, Gollini moved to Napoli on loan with an option to buy.

International career
Gollini made his debut with the Italy U21 team on 2 June 2016, in a 0–1 loss against France.

Gollini made his senior debut for Italy under manager Roberto Mancini, on 15 November 2019, coming on as a late substitute for Gianluigi Donnarumma in a 3–0 away win over Bosnia and Herzegovina, in a Euro 2020 qualifier.

Personal life
In June 2018, under the pseudonym Gollorius, Gollini published a rap music single "Rapper coi guanti" (Rapper with gloves); he donated the proceeds to charity.

Career statistics

Club

International

References

External links

 
 

1995 births
Living people
Footballers from Bologna
Italian footballers
Association football goalkeepers
ACF Fiorentina players
Manchester United F.C. players
Hellas Verona F.C. players
Aston Villa F.C. players
Atalanta B.C. players
Tottenham Hotspur F.C. players
S.S.C. Napoli players
Serie A players
English Football League players
Italy youth international footballers
Italy under-21 international footballers
Italy international footballers
Italian expatriate footballers
Italian expatriate sportspeople in England
Expatriate footballers in England